Hannes Stöhr (born 1970) is a German film director and screenwriter. He studied scriptwriting and directing at the Deutsche Film- und Fernsehakademie Berlin from 1994 to 1999. In 2006 Stöhr was a  Villa Aurora grant recipient and lived for six months in Los Angeles, California. Hannes speaks German, Spanish, English, French and Portuguese. Stöhr is member of the European Filmacademy, lectures film at Film Academy Baden-Württemberg, Deutsche Film- und Fernsehakademie Berlin and the Goethe Institute. He lives in Berlin.

Career
Stöhr's first cinema feature Berlin is in Germany won the Panorama Audience award at the International Berlin Filmfestival 2001, the German critics association award, the Studio Hamburg award, and many others. Main actor Jörg Schüttauf won the German Film critics association award for his performance in Berlin is in Germany. Berlin is in Germany  was a box office hit in Germany and was distributed in France, Spain, Turkey and other countries. "Berlin is in Germany is a film about change, says its director, Hannes Stöhr, in an impeccable Spanish learned in Colombia, Mexico and Galicia" comments el Pais.

His second feature One Day in Europe  screened in competition at the International Berlin Filmfestival 2005 and was distributed in Great Britain, Russia, Spain, Japan and other countries. The BBC writes about One Day in Europe: "This is a movie full of touching, funny moments."

The techno musicfilm Berlin Calling was written and directed by Hannes Stöhr and had its international Premiere on Piazza Grande at the Locarno Film festival 2008. Berlin Calling ran for several years in German cinemas and was also released in Italy, Poland, Hungary, Argentina, Chile and other countries. In 2010 the film won the Arte Audience award. Berlin Calling was partly shot in two Berlin nightclubs, Bar 25  and Maria am Ostbahnhof. The American magazine Rolling Stone called Berlin Calling "the hit film about a DJ in the city's exploding techno scene at the turn of the millennium." The title song of Berlin calling named Sky and Sand entered the charts in several European countries, and it was certified gold by the Federation of the Italian Music Industry. It reached number two in the Belgian Ultratop 50. In Germany it became the longest running chart hit of all time spending 129 weeks on the German singles charts.

Looking back Hannes said that he can see his first three feature films as forming a trilogy: “Berlin is in Germany shows Berlin viewed from the alien perspective, One Day in Europe shows Berlin in the European context, and Berlin Calling is now the view from within.”

His film  was filmed in China and Hechingen, the home town of Hannes Stöhr. The film screened at the Miami International Filmfestival 2014 among other film festivals. It was Hannes third visit at the Miami International Film festival. The film was also adapted as a theatre play.

References

External links

Official Website (English)

1970 births
Living people
Film people from Stuttgart